Philip Julius Bernhard von Platen (14 March 1732 - 23 April 1805) was a Swedish politician and field marshal.

Von Platen was admitted to the Swedish Ritterschaft on October 23, 1778. On August 23, 1788, he rose to the lieutenant general and advanced on November 2, 1795, to the General of Cavalry, was held on November 1, 1797, in the Swedish Freemasonry, and rose to the Field Marshal on November 16, 1799. From 1796 to 1800 he was the Governor-General of Swedish Pomerania.

He fought in 1758-1762 during the Seven Years' War in Pomerania and was wounded in battle at Löcknitz.

References 

Swedish politicians
Field marshals of Sweden
1732 births
1805 deaths